This local electoral calendar for 2017 lists the subnational elections held in 2017. Referendums, recall and retention elections, and national by-elections (special elections) are also included.

January
8 January: India, Maharashtra, Municipal Councils and Town Councils (4th phase)
22 January: 
Tanzania, Dimani, National Assembly by-election
Zimbabwe, Bikita West, House of Assembly by-election
23 January: Trinidad and Tobago, Tobago, House of Assembly
27–28 January: Czech Republic, Most, 
28 January: Ivory Coast, District 92 and District 126, National Assembly by-elections
29 January: 
Haiti, Communal Boards (CASEC), Communal Assemblies (ASEC) and City Delegates (DV)
Japan, Gifu, 
31 January: Bangladesh, Tangail-4, House of the Nation by-election

February
1 February: India, Nagaland, Urban Local Bodies (election nullified)
4 February: India
Amritsar, House of the People by-election
Goa, Legislative Assembly
Punjab, Legislative Assembly
5 February: Austria, Graz, 
11 February: 
India, Uttar Pradesh, Legislative Assembly (1st phase)
Nigeria, Yobe, Local Government Councils and Chairmen
12 February: 
Mauritius, Rodrigues, Regional Assembly
Switzerland
Aargau, 
Basel-Stadt, referendums
Grisons, 
Neuchâtel, referendums
Schwyz, 
Thurgau, 
Ticino, referendums
Vaud, referendum
13 February: India, Odisha, District Councils, Township Councils and Village Councils (1st phase)
14 February: United States, Oklahoma City, City Council (1st round)
15 February: 
India
Odisha, District Councils, Township Councils and Village Councils (2nd phase)
Uttar Pradesh, Legislative Assembly (2nd phase)
Uttarakhand, Legislative Assembly
Indonesia, Governors, Regents and Mayors
Jakarta, Governor (1st round)
16 February: India, Maharashtra, District Councils and Township Councils (1st phase)
17 February: India, Odisha, District Councils, Township Councils and Village Councils (3rd phase)
19 February: India
Odisha, District Councils, Township Councils and Village Councils (4th phase)
Uttar Pradesh, Legislative Assembly (3rd phase) 
21 February: India
Maharashtra, District Councils, Township Councils (2nd phase) and Municipal Corporations
Mumbai, Municipal Corporation
Odisha, District Councils, Township Councils and Village Councils (5th phase)
23 February: 
India, Uttar Pradesh, Legislative Assembly (4th phase) 
United Kingdom, Copeland and Stoke-on-Trent Central, House of Commons 
24 February: Djibouti, Regional Assemblies, Mayors and Communal Assemblies 
25 February: 
New Zealand, Mount Albert, Parliament by-election
Nigeria
Gombe, Local Government Councils and Chairmen
Taraba, Local Government Councils and Chairmen
27 February: India, Uttar Pradesh, Legislative Assembly (5th phase)

March
2 March: United Kingdom, Northern Ireland, Assembly
4 March: India
Manipur, Legislative Assembly (1st phase)
Uttar Pradesh, Legislative Assembly (6th phase)
5 March: Switzerland, Valais, 
7 March: 
Federated States of Micronesia, Chuuk, Governor, House of Representatives and Senate
United States, Los Angeles, Mayor and City Council (1st round)
8 March: India
Manipur, Legislative Assembly (2nd phase)
Uttar Pradesh, Legislative Assembly (7th phase)  
11 March: Australia, Western Australia, Legislative Assembly and Legislative Council
12 March: Switzerland, Solothurn, Executive Council (1st round) and Cantonal Council
17 March: Djibouti, Regional Assemblies, Mayors and Communal Assemblies 
19 March: Switzerland, Valais, 
22 March: Bangladesh, Gaibandha-1, National Parliament by-election
United States, Louisiana, Circuit Courts of Appeal (1st round)
26 March: 
Germany, Saarland, Parliament
Japan, Chiba, 
27 March: Antigua and Barbuda, Barbuda, Council
30 March: Bangladesh
Sunamganj-2, House of the Nation by-election
Comilla, Mayor and City Corporation

April
1 April: Myanmar
Ann, Chaungzon, Dagon Seikkan, East Dagon, Hlaingthaya, Kawhmu, Kyethi, Mong Hsu and Monywa, House of Representatives by-elections
Bago constituency 4, Chin constituency 3 and Yangon constituency 6, House of Nationalities by-elections
2 April: Switzerland, Neuchâtel, Council of State and Grand Council
3 April: Canada, Calgary Heritage, Calgary Midnapore, Markham—Thornhill, Ottawa—Vanier and Saint-Laurent, House of Commons by-elections
4 April: 
Greenland, Municipal Councils and Settlement Councils
United States
Anchorage, Assembly
Colorado Springs, City Council
Las Vegas, City Council (1st round)
Oklahoma City, City Council (2nd round)
St. Louis, Mayor and Board of Aldermen
Wisconsin, Superintendent of Public Instruction, Supreme Court and Court of Appeals
8 April: U.S. Virgin Islands, St. Thomas/St. John district, Parliament special election
9 April: 
Finland, Municipal Councils
India, Srinagar, House of the People by-election
Japan, Akita, Governor
11 April: United States, Kansas's 4th congressional district, U.S. House of Representatives special election
12 April: 
India, Malappuram, House of the People by-election
South Korea, Sangju-Gunwi-Uiseong-Cheongsong, 
Uganda, Kamuli, Parliament by-election
19 April: Indonesia, Jakarta, Governor (2nd round)
22 April: Nigeria, Ebonyi, Local Government Councils and Chairmen
23 April: 
India, Delhi, Municipal Corporations
Japan, Nagoya, 
Switzerland, Solothurn, Executive Council (2nd round)
29 April: United States, Louisiana, Circuit Courts of Appeal (2nd round)
30 April: Switzerland
Appenzell Innerrhoden, Landsgemeinde
Vaud,

May
4 May: 
India, Mizoram, Mara Autonomous District, Council
United Kingdom, Local elections
England, County Councils, Unitary Authorities, Metropolitan Borough Council and Mayors
Buckinghamshire, County Council
Cambridgeshire, Mayor and County Council
Cornwall, Council
Cumbria, County Council
Derbyshire, County Council
Devon, County Council
Dorset, County Council
Durham, County Council
East Sussex, County Council
Essex, County Council
Gloucestershire, County Council
Greater Manchester, Mayor
Hampshire, County Council
Hertfordshire, County Council
Isle of Wight, Council
Isles of Scilly, Council
Kent, County Council
Lancashire, County Council
Leicestershire, County Council
Lincolnshire, County Council
Liverpool City Region, Mayor
Norfolk, County Council
North Yorkshire, County Council
Northamptonshire, County Council
Northumberland, County Council
Nottinghamshire, County Council
Oxfordshire, County Council
Shropshire, Council
Somerset, County Council
Staffordshire, County Council
Suffolk, County Council
Surrey, County Council
Tees Valley City Region, Mayor
Warwickshire, County Council
West of England, Mayor
West Midlands, Mayor
West Sussex, County Council
Wiltshire, Council
Worcestershire, County Council
Scotland, Councils
Wales, Councils
6 May: 
Australia, Tasmania, (Launceston, Murchison and Rumney) Legislative Council
Maldives, City Councils, Atoll Councils and Island Councils
United States
Arlington, Mayor and City Council (1st round)
Dallas, City Council (1st round)
El Paso, Mayor and City Council (1st round)
Fort Worth, Mayor and City Council (1st round)
San Antonio, Mayor and City Council (1st round)
7 May: 
Germany, Schleswig-Holstein, Parliament
Italy, Aosta Valley and Trentino-Alto Adige/Südtirol, Mayors and Municipal Councils
Switzerland, Glarus, 
9 May: 
Canada, British Columbia, Legislative Assembly
United States, Omaha, Mayor and City Council
13 May: Palestine, West Bank, 
14 May: 
Abkhazia, Gudauta, People's Assembly by-election
Armenia, Yerevan, City Council
Germany, North Rhine-Westphalia, Parliament
Nepal, Mayors, Deputy Mayors, Ward Chairs and Ward Members (1st phase)
16 May: United States, Los Angeles, City Council (2nd round)
17 May: Cook Islands, Avatiu-Ruatonga-Palmerston, Parliament by-election
19 May: Iran, City Councils and Village Councils
Tehran, City Council
21 May: 
Croatia, County Prefects, County Councils, Mayors and Municipal Councils 
India, Bihar, Municipal Corporations, Municipal Councils and Town Councils (1st phase)
Switzerland
Aargau, 
Basel-Landschaft, 
Basel-Stadt, referendums
Bern, 
Fribourg, 
Geneva, referendums
Lucerne, 
Obwalden, referendums
Schaffhausen, referendums
Schwyz, 
Solothurn, 
Ticino, referendum
Uri, 
Valais, referendum
Vaud, 
Zug, 
Zürich, 
25 May: United States, Montana's at-large congressional district, U.S. House of Representatives special election
27 May: Canada, Métis Nation-Saskatchewan, President
30 May: Canada, Nova Scotia, House of Assembly

June
3 June: 
Latvia, Municipal Councils
Riga, 
Nigeria, Benue, Local Government Councils and Chairmen
United States, Cherokee Nation, Tribal Council (1st round)
4 June: 
Argentina, La Rioja, 
Cambodia, Commune Chiefs and Commune Councils
Croatia, County Prefects, County Councils, Mayors and Municipal Councils (2nd round)
India, Bihar, Municipal Corporations, Municipal Councils and Town Councils (2nd phase)
Mexico, State elections
Coahuila, 
Mexico State, 
Nayarit, 
Veracruz, 
6 June: United States, California's 34th congressional district, U.S. House of Representatives special election
7 June: India, Bihar, Municipal Corporations, Municipal Councils and Town Councils (3rd phase)
8 June: United Kingdom, Scotland, Ettrick, Roxburgh and Berwickshire, Scottish Parliament 
10 June: United States
Arlington, City Council (2nd round)
Dallas, City Council (2nd round)
El Paso, Mayor and City Council (2nd round)
Fort Worth, City Council (2nd round)
San Antonio, Mayor and City Council (2nd round)
11 June: 
India, Goa, Village Councils (1st phase)
Italy, Mayors and Municipal Councils (1st round)
13 June: United States, Las Vegas, City Council (2nd round)
17 June: India, Assam, Karbi Anglong, Autonomous Council
18 June: Switzerland, Bernese Jura, Moutier, 
20 June: United States, Georgia's 6th congressional district and South Carolina's 5th congressional district, U.S. House of Representatives 
25 June: 
Italy, Mayors and Municipal Councils (2nd round)
Japan, Shizuoka, 
28 June: Nepal, Mayors, Deputy Mayors, Ward Chairs and Ward Members (2nd phase)
29 June: Uganda, Kyadondo East, Parliament by-election

July
1 July: 
India, Goa, Village Councils (2nd phase)
Nigeria, Jigawa, Local Government Councils and Chairmen
2 July: Japan
Hyōgo, 
Tokyo, Metropolitan Assembly
8 July: Nigeria, Osun West, Senate by-election
15 July: 
Nigeria, Kebbi, Local Government Councils and Chairmen
Pakistan, NA-260, National Assembly by-election
16 July: 
Republic of the Congo, Departmental Councils and Municipal Councils (1st round)
Zimbabwe, Chiwundura, National Assembly by-election
18 July: Syria, Saraqib, City Council
19 July: Tuvalu, Vaitupu, Parliament by-election
22 July: 
Nigeria, Lagos, Local Government Councils and Chairmen
United States, Cherokee Nation, Tribal Council (2nd round)
23 July: Argentina, Chaco, 
26 July: Saint Helena, Ascension and Tristan da Cunha, Saint Helena, Legislative Council
29 July: Palestine, West Bank, 
30 July: 
Republic of the Congo, Departmental Councils and Municipal Councils (2nd round)
Japan, Yokohama,

August
6 August: Brazil, Amazonas, Governor special election (1st round)
8 August: Kenya, Governors and County Assemblies
15 August: Jordan, Governorate Councils, Mayors and Municipal Councils
17 August: Cook Islands, Ivirua, Parliament by-election
26 August: Australia, Northern Territory, Mayors, City Councils, Town Councils, Regional Councils and Shire Councils
27 August: 
Brazil, Amazonas, Governor special election (2nd round)
Japan, Ibaraki, 
29 August: United States, Phoenix, City Council
31 August: Uganda, Kalungu, Parliament by-election

September
3 September: Chile, Easter Island, Referendum
9 September: Australia, New South Wales, Mayors, Regional Councils, City Councils and Shire Councils
10 September: Russia, 
Belgorod Oblast, 
Bryansk Oblast, District 77, State Duma by-election
Buryatia, Head
Kaliningrad Oblast, Governor
Karelia (Republic), Head
Kirov Oblast, Governor
Krasnodar Krai, Legislative Assembly
Leningrad Oblast, District 112, State Duma by-election
Mari El, 
Mordovia, 
Moscow, Municipal Councils
North Ossetia–Alania, 
Novgorod Oblast, Governor
Penza Oblast, 
Perm Krai, Governor
Ryazan Oblast, Governor
Sakhalin Oblast, 
Saratov Oblast,  and 
Sevastopol, Governor
Sverdlovsk Oblast, 
Tomsk Oblast, Governor
Udmurtia,  and 
Yaroslavl Oblast, Governor
11 September: Norway, Sámi Parliament
17 September: 
Pakistan, NA-120, National Assembly by-election
Switzerland, Bernese Jura, Belprahon and Sorvilier, 
18 September: Nepal, Mayors, Deputy Mayors, Ward Chairs and Ward Members (3rd phase)
22 September: Syria, Rojava, Communes
24 September: 
Germany
Berlin, 
Bremen, 
Duisburg, Lord Mayor
Switzerland
Basel-Landschaft, 
Geneva, referendum
Lucerne, 
Neuchâtel, referendums
Schaffhausen, referendums
Schwyz, 
Solothurn, 
Ticino, referendums
Uri, 
Zürich, 
25 September: Iraq, Kurdistan Region, Independence Referendum
26 September: Canada, Newfoundland and Labrador, Mayors and City Councils
30 September: Lesotho
Hololo, Thupa-Kubu and Teyateyaneng, National Assembly by-elections
Municipal Councils and Community Councils

October
1 October: 
Austria, Burgenland, 
Portugal, Municipal Chambers, Municipal Assemblies and Parish Assemblies
Spain, Catalonia, Independence Referendum
3 October: United States, Albuquerque, Mayor and City Council (1st round)
7 October: India, Manipur, District Councils, Township Councils and Village Councils
8 October: 
Argentina, Corrientes, 
Luxembourg, Communal Councils
10 October: United States, Raleigh, Mayor (1st round) and City Council
11 October: India, Gurdaspur, House of the People by-election
14 October: United States, Louisiana, Public Service Commission, Treasurer  and Circuit Courts of Appeal
New Orleans, Mayor and City Council (1st round)
14–15 October: Republic of Macedonia, Mayors and Municipal Councils (1st round)
15 October: 
Austria, Tyrol, 2026 Olympics Bid referendum
Estonia, Municipal Councils
Germany, Lower Saxony, Parliament
Venezuela, Governors
16 October: Canada, Alberta, Mayors and Municipal Councils
Calgary, Mayor, City Council and School Trustees
Edmonton, Mayor, City Council and School Trustees
17 October: Malawi, Lilongwe City South East, Lilongwe Msozi North and Nsanje Lalanje, National Assembly by-elections
21 October: 
Australia
Christmas Island, Shire Council
Cocos (Keeling) Islands, Shire Council
Western Australia, Mayors, Regional Councils, City Councils and Shire Councils
Georgia, Mayors and Municipal Councils
22 October: 
Argentina
Buenos Aires, 
Buenos Aires City, 
Catamarca, 
Corrientes, Mayors and Municipal Councils
Formosa, 
Jujuy, 
Mendoza, 
Misiones, 
Salta, 
San Luis, 
Santiago del Estero, 
Italy
Lombardy, Regional Autonomy referendum
Veneto, Regional Autonomy referendum
Belluno, 
Japan
Aomori District 4, Ehime District 3 and Niigata District 5, 
Miyagi, Governor
Kosovo, Mayors (1st round) and Municipal Councils
23 October: Canada, Lac-Saint-Jean and Sturgeon River—Parkland, House of Commons 
26 October: Pakistan, NA-4, National Assembly by-election
27 October: Brazil, Paraná, Rio Grande do Sul and Santa Catarina, South Region Separatist referendum
28–29 October: Republic of Macedonia, Mayors and Municipal Councils (2nd round)
29 October: 
Austria, Burgenland, 
Brazil, Niterói, Armament of Municipal Guard referendum
30 October: 
Canada, Nunavut, Legislative Assembly
Jamaica, Saint Andrew Southern, Saint Andrew South Western and Saint Mary South Eastern, House of Representatives by-elections

November
3 November: India, Sikkim, District Councils and Village Councils
4 November: 
Nigeria, Enugu, Local Government Councils and Chairmen
Slovakia, Governors and Regional Councils
5 November: 
Canada, Quebec, Mayors and Municipal Councils
Montreal, Mayor and City Council
Quebec City, Mayor and City Council
Italy, Sicily, Regional Assembly
Nicaragua, Mayors and Municipal Councils
7 November: United States, State and Local elections
Utah's 3rd congressional district, U.S. House of Representatives special election
Maine, Medicaid Expansion referendum
New Jersey, Governor, General Assembly and Senate
New York, Pension Forfeiture for Convicted Officials constitutional referendum and Constitutional Convention referendum
Ohio, Drug Price Relief referendum
Pennsylvania, Supreme Court and Superior Court retention elections, and Supreme Court, Commonwealth Court and Superior Court
Virginia, Governor, Lieutenant Governor, Attorney General and House of Delegates
Washington, Court of Appeals
Atlanta, Mayor and City Council (1st round)
Aurora, CO, City Council
Boston, Mayor and City Council
Charlotte, Mayor and City Council
Cincinnati, Mayor and City Council
Cleveland, Mayor and City Council
Columbus, City Council
Detroit, Mayor and City Council
Flint, Mayor recall election
King County, Executive and Council
Seattle, Mayor and City Council
Miami, Mayor and City Commission (1st round)
Minneapolis, Mayor, City Council, Board of Estimate and Taxation and Park and Recreation Board
New York City, Mayor, Comptroller, Public Advocate and City Council
Pittsburgh, Mayor and City Council
Raleigh, Mayor (2nd round)
Tucson, City Council
Wichita, City Council
9 November: India, Himachal Pradesh, Legislative Assembly
11 November: 
Nigeria, Akwa Ibom, Local Government Councils and Chairmen
United States, New York City, Borough Presidents
12 November: 
Equatorial Guinea, Municipal Councils
Japan, Hiroshima, 
Republic of Macedonia, Čair, Mayors and Municipal Councils (3rd round)
14 November: United States, Albuquerque, Mayor and City Council (2nd round)
18 November: 
Nigeria
Anambra, Governor
Kwara, Local Government Councils and Chairmen
United States, Louisiana, Treasurer special election (2nd round)
New Orleans, Mayor and City Council (2nd round)
19 November: 
Chile, Regional Councils
Kosovo, Mayors (2nd round)
21 November: 
Denmark, Regional Councils and Municipal Councils
United States, Miami, City Commission (2nd round)
22 November: India, Uttar Pradesh, Municipal Corporations, Municipal Councils and Town Councils (1st phase)
23 November: Algeria, 
25 November: Australia, Queensland, Legislative Assembly
26 November: 
Cuba, 
Honduras, 
India, Uttar Pradesh, Municipal Corporations, Municipal Councils and Town Councils (2nd phase)
Nepal, Provincial Assemblies (1st round)
Switzerland
Basel-Landschaft, 
Neuchâtel, referendums
Nidwalden, referendum
Obwalden, referendum
Schaffhausen, referendums
Thurgau, 
29 November: India, Uttar Pradesh, Municipal Corporations, Municipal Councils and Town Councils (3rd phase)
30 November: Saint Helena, Ascension and Tristan da Cunha, Ascension Island, Council

December
1 December: Syria, Rojava, Regional Councils, Canton Councils, Area Councils and District Councils
2 December: Australia, New England, House of Representatives by-election
3 December: 
Cuba, 
France, Corsica, Assembly (1st round)
5 December: United States, Atlanta, Mayor and City Council (2nd round)
7 December: Nepal, Provincial Assemblies (2nd round)
9 December: India, Gujarat, Legislative Assembly (1st phase) 
10 December: 
France, Corsica, Assembly (2nd round)
Venezuela, Mayors
Zulia, 
11 December: Canada, Battlefords—Lloydminster, Bonavista—Burin—Trinity, Scarborough—Agincourt and South Surrey—White Rock, House of Commons by-elections
12 December: United States, Alabama, U.S. Senate special election
14 December: India, Gujarat, Legislative Assembly (2nd phase)
16 December: Australia, Bennelong, House of Representatives by-election
17 December: India, Punjab, Municipal Corporations, Municipal Councils and Town Councils
18 December: Saint Kitts and Nevis, Nevis, Island Assembly
21 December: 
Bangladesh, Rangpur, Mayor and City Corporation
Spain, Catalonia, Parliament
23 December: Nigeria, Ekiti, Local Government Councils and Chairmen
24 December: Uzbekistan, Tashkent, District Councils

References

2017 elections
2017
Political timelines of the 2010s by year
local